Frank Stanmore (10 March 1877 – 15 August 1943) was an English film actor. He appeared in 76 films between 1914 and 1938. He was born in London and died in Gravesend, Kent.

Selected filmography

 The Third String (1914)
 Love in a Wood (1915)
 The Mother of Dartmoor (1916)
 Mother Love (1916)
 The Grit of a Jew (1917)
 Judge Not (1920)
 The Wonderful Year (1921)
 Love's Boomerang (1922)
 The Spanish Jade (1922)
 A Rogue in Love (1922)
 Love, Life and Laughter (1923)
 The School for Scandal (1923)
 The Naked Man (1923)
 Squibs M.P.  (1923)
 Squibs' Honeymoon (1923)
 Lily of the Alley (1924)
 Her Redemption (1924)
 The Alley of Golden Hearts (1924)
 Reveille (1924)
 The Blackguard (1925)
 Satan's Sister (1925)
 Cats (1925)
 The Little People (1926)
 Blinkeyes (1926)
 The Only Way (1927)
 The Hellcat (1928)
 What Next? (1928)
 Houp La! (1928)
 Chamber of Horrors (1929)
 Wait and See (1929)
 Three Men in a Cart (1929)
 Little Miss London (1929)
 Red Pearls (1930)
 Leave It to Me (1930)
 You'd Be Surprised! (1930)
 The Great Gay Road (1931)
 Let's Love and Laugh (1931)
 The Old Man (1931)
 Lucky Girl (1932)
 Don Quixote (1933)
 Dora (1933)
 That's a Good Girl (1933)
 It's a Bet (1935)
 I Live Again (1936)

External links

1877 births
1943 deaths
English male film actors
English male silent film actors
Male actors from London
20th-century English male actors